Rubus biflorus is a flowering plant in the genus Rubus (including raspberries and blackberries), in the family Rosaceae.  It is a deciduous, suckering shrub, native to East Asia, growing 3m to 3.5m, which is grown ornamentally for its arching white thorny stems in Winter.  The underside of the pinnate leaves also has a white bloom. The flowers are white, sometimes followed by edible yellow fruits. This plant has gained the Royal Horticultural Society's Award of Garden Merit.

References

External links
 

biflorus